7828 Odney Manor is a Great Western Railway locomotive part of the Manor Class. It is one of 9 locomotives preserved from the class which originally had 30. Built by British Railways in 1950 it was withdrawn from service in 1965 before being moved to Woodham Brothers scrapyard in Barry, South Wales. Since 2004 it has been owned by the West Somerset Railway, being based there since 1995. In 2011 the locomotive was temporarily renamed Norton Manor in honour of the local Marine Base near the West Somerset Railway.

History

Preservation

It was rescued from Barry privately in 1981 and moved to the Gloucestershire Warwickshire Railway where restoration was completed by 1987. It worked on the Gwilli Railway, Llangollen Railway and East Lancashire Railway before coming to the West Somerset Railway (WSR) in 1995. Its owners sold it to the WSR in 2004. 

On 17 June 2011 it was temporarily renamed Norton Manor after 40 Commando's base alongside the railway at Norton Fitzwarren. Originally, the Great Western Railway had intended to give the name Norton Manor to new locomotive number 7830, but the order for this locomotive was cancelled. It (7828) has been repainted in the BR lined green livery that Odney Manor carried in 1957.

References

External links

 West Somerset Railway 

7828
Railway locomotives introduced in 1950
7828
Standard gauge steam locomotives of Great Britain